Uganda Athletic Federation (UAF) is a World Athletics recognised member officially representing Uganda as the national governing body for the sport of Athletics.

History
The country of Uganda gained independence in 1962.  A mere ten years later, they proudly achieved their first Olympic Gold Medal when John Akii-Bua took the 400 metres hurdles in world record time.  Ugandan women athletes have made their mark as well, Dorcus Inzikuru was the winner of the first Women's 3000 metres steeplechase world championship.  Stephen Kiprotich doubled that success, winning the Olympic gold medal in the marathon and backing it up a year later with the World Championship.

As of 2022, Dominic Otuchet (also spelled Dominec Otuchet, among other spelling variants) is the president of the federation.

References

External links

 

National members of the Confederation of African Athletics
Athletics in Uganda
Sports governing bodies in Uganda
National governing bodies for athletics